West Caldwell High School (WCHS) is a public high school in Lenoir, North Carolina, United States. It is part of the Caldwell County Schools district.

Notable alumni 
 Destin Hall, attorney and politician
 Jason Hatfield, actor and voice actor

References

External links 
 

Public high schools in North Carolina
Schools in Caldwell County, North Carolina